Ariettes oubliées (Forgotten Songs) is a song cycle for voice and piano, L. 60 by Claude Debussy, based on poems by Paul Verlaine.  The work consists of six different pieces, with an approximate run time of sixteen minutes.

History

The six ariettes were composed mainly in Rome and Paris during the year, 1886.  The first two were completed in March 1887, with the others following close behind.  They were re-published once again in 1903 under the official title of: Ariettes oubliées.  Once published officially, Verlaine's poetry was brought back into the spotlight.  This was largely due to Debussy's meticulous approach to composing for previously published text.  Never before had words and music been so carefully and consciously paired.  

However, after this period of time, Debussy's compositions for piano and voice declined.  The exact reason for this is unknown.  Although, many speculate that Debussy could've been left uninspired by the lack of a talented singer in his proximity.  Additionally, Symbolist circles that Debussy was a part of were strongly critical of language during the time, which more than likely contributed to the lack of compositions.   Debussy didn't compose for piano and voice again until 1910 when he set François Villon's poetic, final last statement to music.  

The song cycle was dedicated to the singer Mary Garden, who was known for performing as Mélisande, a role from one of Debussy's operatic works.  The poetry of Paul Verlaine had a more profound influence on Claude Debussy's music than did Debussy's closest literary or musical acquaintances.

Debussy and Verlaine were both inspired by subtlety and nuance.  Each man sought to innovate by using rhythm and tone color as the basis for a new form of a pre-existing art.  In the Ariettes oubliées, subtlety, nuance, rhythm and tone color (timbre) converged to create a mature compositional style for Debussy, which, in turn, gave a heightened level of understanding to Verlaine's poetry. This collection of songs set the tone for all of Debussy's future vocal compositions in terms of rhythm, harmony, tone, color and attention to poetic detail.

1. C'est l'extase langoureuse 

"C'est l'extase langoureuse" was composed in 1887 and was included in the 1903 publication of Ariettes oubliées as the first piece of the cycle.  The piece was one of Debussy's earliest compositions.  Additionally, the piece is known as one of Debussy's most sophisticated experiments in tonal composition.

The text comes from Verlaine's Romances sans paroles, which was published in 1874.  The poetry used for this particular piece was written in a, a, b, c, c, b form and describes the fatigue of love and longing throughout the text.

A quote by Favart is included with the score, which states: "Le vent dans la plaine suspend son haleine."  When translated to English, this quote reads: "The wind over the plain is holding its breath."  This quote directly relates to the sense of longing established by the poetry, as well as Debussy's compositional style of dramatic crescendos/diminuendos, as well as sustained, ultimately descending chords throughout the accompaniment.

2. Il pleure dans mon coeur 

The second piece of the cycle, "Il pleure dans mon coeur" compares falling rain to falling tears.  Written in G sharp minor, Debussy's music includes almost continuous eighth notes that alternate between the right and left hands, creating an atmosphere that evokes the sound of raindrops.  In addition to the eighth notes, a slow moving legato melody is played throughout the entire piece, complimenting the sadness the poetry describes.

The quote that accompanies this particular piece is one by R. Rimbaud, which reads: "Il pleut doucement sur la ville."  In English, this translates: "It rains lightly over the city."

3. L'ombre des arbres 

As the third song in the cycle, 'L'ombre des arbres" provides a dramatic shift in tempo when compared to the first two pieces.  The initial 'Lent et triste' instruction is interpreted as 'slow and sad.'  This instruction compliments the weary and hopeless imagery created by the text and supported by the accompaniment.

The opening quote for this piece is one that comes from Cyrano de Bergerac.  It reads: "Le rossignol qui du haut d'une branche se regarde dedans, croit étre tombé dans la riviére.  Il est au sommet d'un chêne et toutefois il a peur de se noyer."  In English, this translates as: "The nightingale, from a high branch, sees himself reflected below, and believes he has fallen into the river.  He is at the top of an oak tree, and, nevertheless, fears he will be drowned."

4. Chevaux de Bois 

As the fourth piece of the cycle, Chevaux de Bois dramatically changes the overall atmosphere of the cycle with a fast, lively piano accompaniment and vocal line. The piano starts with fortissimo trills, accompanied by accented, detached eighth notes and triplets.  After a robust introduction, the singer jumps right in, exclaiming "Tournez, tournez."  The piece continues on with an exciting, forward-moving accompaniment, ultimately slowing into a pianissimo finale in E major.  

An opening quote at the top of the score from V. Hugo reads: "Par saint-Gille, viens-nous-en, mon agile Alezan;"

5. Green (Aquarelle) 

"Green" explores the emotions of young love.  Published in 1888, Debussy composed this piece through the utilization of compound and simple meter.  Generally, the compound meter accompanies the lines of the poetry describing actions, while the simple meter accompanies the requests made by the lover.

6. Spleen (Aquarelle) 

While a specific date is unknown, "Spleen" was composed between 1885 and 1887.   As the final piece of the cycle, "Spleen," describes a pleading lover and the ultimate fragility of the relationship at stake.  The accompaniment starts out slow (Lent) and pianissimo, ultimately building to a grand fortissimo.  The piece ends with a molto rallentando, back to pianissimo and into the lyric "hélas!" ultimately signifying the rest Verlaine's poetry describes.

References

Bibliography

 
 Guthrie, Roberta Alma. Six Poems of Verlaine and Their Settings by Faure and Debussy. University of Southern California, 1965.

External links
 
 

Song cycles by Claude Debussy
Musical settings of poems by Paul Verlaine
1887 compositions
Classical song cycles in French